Carl Serrant (born 12 September 1975) is an English former footballer, most recently Assistant Manager of Newport County.

Career
Born in Bradford, West Yorkshire, Serrant made more than 100 appearances in the Football League with Oldham Athletic, Newcastle United, Bury as well as earning a cap for England B before his professional career was cut short by injury. He later returned to play in non-league for Bradford Park Avenue, Droylsden and Farsley Celtic. Whilst at Farsley he joined the coaching staff at Leeds United.

In November 2007 he joined Crystal Palace as a fitness coach. After less than a year with Palace, Serrant moved to Sheffield United as a strength conditioning coach. In 2017, he was appointed joint head of fitness and conditioning at Cardiff City.

On 22 February 2022 Serrant was appointed assistant manager to James Rowberry at Newport County. On 10 October 2022 Rowberry was sacked with Newport in 18th place in League two after 13 league matches of the 2022–23 season. Serrant was also sacked Newport's Sporting Director Darren Kelly took the role of caretaker manager.

References

External links

1975 births
Living people
Footballers from Bradford
Association football fullbacks
English footballers
England B international footballers
Oldham Athletic A.F.C. players
Newcastle United F.C. players
Bury F.C. players
Sheffield United F.C. players
Bradford (Park Avenue) A.F.C. players
Droylsden F.C. players
Farsley Celtic A.F.C. players
English Football League players
Premier League players
Leeds United F.C. non-playing staff
Crystal Palace F.C. non-playing staff
Sheffield United F.C. non-playing staff
Queens Park Rangers F.C. non-playing staff
Cardiff City F.C. non-playing staff
Newport County A.F.C. non-playing staff